Johannes Geis (born 17 August 1993) is a German professional footballer who plays as a defensive midfielder, for 1. FC Nürnberg.

Club career

Early career
Geis made his Bundesliga debut for 1. FSV Mainz 05 at 11 August 2013 in a 3–2 home win against VfB Stuttgart. On 17 August 2013, he provided an assist to Niki Zimling's opening goal in a 1–2 away win against SC Freiburg.

Schalke 04
On 23 June 2015, Geis joined FC Schalke 04 on a four-year deal for a fee in the region of €12 million.

On 8 August, he marked his competitive debut by scoring in a 5–0 win at MSV Duisburg in the first round of the DFB-Pokal.

Geis was sent off for a horrible studs-up challenge on André Hahn in a 3–1 defeat to Borussia Mönchengladbach on 25 October which resulted in a five-match ban for Geis, and left Hahn requiring surgery for a fractured tibia and a lateral meniscus tear. However, Geis was still allowed to play Europa League matches, in which he equalized from the penalty spot against Sparta Prague on 5 November in a 1–1 draw.

Sevilla
On 1 September 2017, Geis joined Spanish club Sevilla on a season-long loan deal, which includes a buyout option for €8 million.

1. FC Köln
On 13 January 2019, Geis signed a contract with 1. FC Köln until the end of the season. In spite of a moderately successful time at Köln, the club announced that they would not offer him a contract extension, making him a free agent from July. He left the club at the end of the season.

International career
Geis made his debut for Germany U21 against France U21 on 13 August 2013 in a friendly game in Freiburg im Breisgau. He replaced Emre Can at half-time.

He represented the under-21 team at the 2015 European Championship in the Czech Republic, starting 1 match and coming on as a substitute in another. Geis made a substitute appearance, coming on for Can in the 77th minute, in their second group match at the Eden Arena in Prague against Denmark, in a 3–0 victory.

Career statistics

References

External links

1993 births
Living people
German footballers
Germany under-21 international footballers
Germany youth international footballers
Association football midfielders
Bundesliga players
2. Bundesliga players
La Liga players
SpVgg Greuther Fürth players
1. FSV Mainz 05 players
FC Schalke 04 players
Sevilla FC players
1. FC Köln players
People from Schweinfurt
Sportspeople from Lower Franconia
German expatriate footballers
German expatriate sportspeople in Spain
Expatriate footballers in Spain
Footballers from Bavaria